Physoglenes is a genus of Chilean araneomorph spiders in the family Physoglenidae that was first described by Eugène Louis Simon in 1904. It has been listed under several different families, including Leptonetidae, Pholcidae, Synotaxidae, and most recently, Physoglenidae.

Species
 it contains four species, found in Chile:
Physoglenes chepu Platnick, 1990 – Chile
Physoglenes lagos Platnick, 1990 – Chile
Physoglenes puyehue Platnick, 1990 – Chile
Physoglenes vivesi Simon, 1904 (type) – Chile

See also
 List of Physoglenidae species

References

Araneomorphae genera
Physoglenidae
Spiders of South America
Endemic fauna of Chile